Datuk Seri Panglima Orang Kaya-Kaya Gunsanad Kina born in 1840 in Bandukan. He was a chief of the Dusun and Murut peoples. In association with Sampuun of Tambunan, he was one of the key figures involved in getting the British North Borneo Company to actively govern the interior region of the then North Borneo.

References

The Datuk Seri Panglima O.K.K Gunsanad Kina

External links 
 

British North Borneo
Kadazan-Dusun people
History of Sabah
People from British Borneo
1840 births
Murut people
1930 deaths
Grand Commanders of the Order of Kinabalu